The Ladies Tshwane Open was a women's professional golf tournament held near Pretoria, Tshwane, South Africa. It was an event on the Southern Africa-based Sunshine Ladies Tour between 2014 and 2019.

Winners

See also
Tshwane Open

References

External links
Coverage on the Sunshine Tour's official site

Sunshine Ladies Tour events
Golf tournaments in South Africa